Latitude Hill may refer to:
 Latitude Hill (Tennessee)
 Latitude Hill (Houtman Abrolhos), a hill on North Island in the Houtman Abrolhos, in the Indian Ocean off the west coast of Australia
 Latitude Hill (Great Victoria Desert), a hill in the Great Victoria Desert, Western Australia